Stanley Vestal (August 15, 1887 – December 25, 1957) was an American writer, poet, biographer, and historian, perhaps best known for his books on the American Old West, including Sitting Bull, Champion of the Sioux.

Biography
Vestal was born Walter Stanley Vestal to Walter Mallory Vestal and the former Isabella "Daisy" Wood near Severy in Greenwood County in southeastern Kansas. Vestal's father died when he was young. His mother remarried, and Vestal took the legal surname Campbell from his stepfather, James Robert Campbell. About 1889, the Campbell family relocated to Guthrie in the newly established Oklahoma Territory, where he learned Native American customs from his boyhood playmates, knowledge which would later be useful in his writing career.

In 1903, Vestal graduated from the new institution, Southwestern Oklahoma State University in Weatherford. His stepfather was the first president of the college. Vestal was Oklahoma's first Rhodes Scholar. He earned a Bachelor of Arts and a Master of Arts in English from Oxford University in England.

Vestal taught for three years at the prestigious Male High School in Louisville, Kentucky, before he became a professor of English at the University of Oklahoma at Norman, where he became known for his courses in creative writing. He temporarily left the university on three occasions, as a captain in an artillery regiment during World War I, as a Guggenheim Fellow from 1930 to 1931, and under a Rockefeller Fellowship in 1946.

Between 1927 and his death on Christmas Day 1957 from a heart attack in Oklahoma City, Vestal wrote more than twenty books, some novels, poems, and as many as one hundred articles about the Old West. He is interred as Walter S. Campbell at the Custer National Cemetery in Big Horn County, Montana.

Partial bibliography
Fandango: Ballads of the Old West, Houghton Mifflin Company, Boston, 1927
Mountain Men''', Houghton Mifflin Company, Boston, 1927
"Happy Hunting Grounds"' Lyons and Carnahan, Chicago, IL, 1928Kit Carson, the Happy Warrior of the West, Houghton Mifflin Company, Boston, 1928Dobe Walls a Story of Kit Carson's Southwest, Houghton Mifflin Company, Boston, 1929Sitting Bull-Champion of the Sioux-a Biography, Houghton Mifflin Company, Boston, 1932New Sources of Indian History 1850–1891. The Ghost Dance. The Prairie Sioux . A Miscellany. University of Oklahoma Press, Norman, 1934
The Wine Room Murder, Little, Brown & Co., Boston, 1935
Revolt On The Border, Houghton Mifflin Company, Boston, 1938
The Old Santa Fe Trail, Houghton Mifflin Company, Boston, 1939
King of the Fur Traders: The Deeds and Deviltry of Pierre Esprit Radisson, Houghton Mifflin Company, Boston, 1940
Big Foot Wallace, A Biography''', Houghton Mifflin Company, Boston, 1942Jim Bridger Mountain Man, William Morrow, New York, 1946Joe Meek, The Merry Mountain Man, Caxton, Caldwell, Idaho, 1952Short Grass Country, Duell, Sloan and Pearce, New York City, 1941
The Missouri, Farrar & Rinehart, New York, 1945 (Volume 26 of the Rivers of America Series)
"Wagons Southwest: Story of Old Trail to Santa Fe," American Pioneer trails Association, New York, 1946
Warpath and Council Fire: The Plains Indians' Struggle for Survival in War and in Diplomacy, 1851–1891, Random House, New York, 1948
Dodge City, Queen of Cowtowns: "The wickedest little city in America", 1872–1886, Harper Brothers, New York, 1952
The Book Lover's Southwest: A guide to good reading, University of Oklahoma Press, Norman, 1955
The Indian Tipi: Its History, Construction, and Use, (with Reginald Laubin & Gladys Laubin), University of Oklahoma Press, Norman, 1957
''Warpath: The True Story of the Fighting Sioux Told in a Biography of Chief White Bull", University of Nebraska Press, Lincoln, 1984 (copyrighted 1934 as Walter Stanley Campbell)

References

American Book Exchange
TIME Magazine, January 25, 1949

1887 births
1957 deaths
People from Greenwood County, Kansas
People from Guthrie, Oklahoma
People from Weatherford, Oklahoma
20th-century American historians
Historians of the United States
Southwestern Oklahoma State University alumni
Writers from Louisville, Kentucky
University of Oklahoma faculty
20th-century American novelists
People from Norman, Oklahoma
20th-century American poets
American male novelists
American male poets
20th-century American male writers
Novelists from Kentucky
Novelists from Oklahoma
American male non-fiction writers
Alumni of Merton College, Oxford